Trachyderomorpha notabilis is a species of beetle in the family Cerambycidae, the only species in the genus Trachyderomorpha.

References

Trachyderini
Monotypic beetle genera